Trephisa parallela is a species of beetle in the family Carabidae, the only species in the genus Trephisa.

References

Psydrinae